Farvaz (also known as Farvar) is a village in Muzaran Rural District, in the Central District of Malayer County, Hamadan Province, Iran. At the 2006 census, its population was 456, in 131 families.

References 

Populated places in Malayer County